Isidore Finance (7 February 1848, Sainte-Croix-aux-Mines – 16 October 1918), Paris was a French house painter and decorator and syndicalist.

He was involved with the Cercle des prolétaires positivistes and contributed to Le Positivisme au Congrès Ouvrier with Fabien Magnin and Emile Laporte

At the Socialist Workers' Congress (1879) in Marseille Finance, he represented the building painters of Paris and urged "tough-fisted and hardheaded workingmen ... to demand a wage that is not simply the equivalent to the product of their labours, but sufficient to keep women and the aged at home."

Works
 Discours sur los sooiétés coopératives 1877

References

Sources

1848 births
1918 deaths
Positivists